Sticks is a 2001 American action comedy film directed by Brett Mayer and starring Lillo Brancato, Justina Machado, and Keith Brunsmann.

Plot
Sticks is an off-beat noir action comedy about a smuggler of Cuban cigars who gets involved, and ultimately falls in love, with a Cuban revolutionary Maria who's in the U.S. trading cigars for guns. The two join forces to sell a large (stolen) shipment of Castro's private label cigar, the famed "El Mariposa", and suddenly they find themselves enmeshed in the seedy underbelly of a mob-run cigar smuggling ring that's being monitored by the feds.

References

2001 action films
2001 films
2000s English-language films